Axiocerses styx is a butterfly in the family Lycaenidae. It is found in north-eastern Tanzania. The habitat consists of lowland forests at altitudes between 600 and 1,000 meters.

References

Butterflies described in 1908
Axiocerses
Endemic fauna of Tanzania
Butterflies of Africa